Stanhopea shuttleworthii is a species of orchid endemic to Colombia (Tolima).

References

External links 

shuttleworthii
Endemic orchids of Colombia
Flora of Tolima Department